The Adams Street Bridge is a bridge that spans the Chicago River in downtown Chicago, Illinois.

References

External links
 
 Chicago River Bridge, West Adams Street, Chicago, Cook County, IL, Library of Congress

1920s architecture in the United States
1927 establishments in Illinois
Bascule bridges in the United States
Bridges completed in 1927
Bridges in Chicago